Herbert Victor Kirk PC (5 June 1912 – 4 March 2006) was an Ulster Unionist cabinet minister in Parliament of Northern Ireland.

Early life
Born in Belfast, Kirk studied at Queen's University, Belfast before becoming an accountant.

Career
Kirk became active in the Ulster Unionist Party (UUP) and in 1956 was elected to represent Belfast Windsor in the Parliament of Northern Ireland.  In 1962, he became the Minister of Labour and National Insurance, also joining the Privy Council of Northern Ireland.  In 1964, he moved to become Minister of Education, and the following year, Minister of Finance.

After the abolition of the Parliament, Kirk was elected in Belfast South to the Northern Ireland Assembly, 1973.  He was a supporter of Brian Faulkner, and was re-appointed as Minister of Finance (de facto Deputy Prime Minister) until the assembly's suspension in May 1974, after which he quit politics.

References

Biographies of Members of the Northern Ireland House of Commons

1912 births
2006 deaths
Ulster Unionist Party members of the House of Commons of Northern Ireland
Members of the House of Commons of Northern Ireland 1953–1958
Members of the House of Commons of Northern Ireland 1958–1962
Members of the House of Commons of Northern Ireland 1962–1965
Members of the House of Commons of Northern Ireland 1965–1969
Members of the House of Commons of Northern Ireland 1969–1973
Members of the Northern Ireland Assembly 1973–1974
Northern Ireland Cabinet ministers (Parliament of Northern Ireland)
Members of the Privy Council of Northern Ireland
Ministers of Finance of Northern Ireland
Members of the House of Commons of Northern Ireland for Belfast constituencies
Executive ministers of the 1974 Northern Ireland Assembly